Campanula jacobaea is a species of flowering plants of the Campanulaceae family. The species is endemic to Cape Verde and is listed as vulnerable by the IUCN. Its local name is contra-bruxas-azul ("blue against witches"). The plant is used in traditional medicine. Campanula jacobaea is shown on a Cape Verdean $5 escudo coin issued in 1994.

Distribution and ecology
Campanula jacobaea are founded in the islands of Santo Antão, São Vicente, São Nicolau and Santiago. The main altitudinal distribution is between 600 m and 1000 m. The plant is a mesophytic species, found in humid and sub-humid areas.

References

jacobaea
Endemic flora of Cape Verde
Endemic flora of Macaronesia
Flora of Santo Antão, Cape Verde
Flora of São Vicente, Cape Verde
Flora of São Nicolau, Cape Verde
Flora of Santiago, Cape Verde